This article shows all participating team squads at the 2004 Women's Pan-American Volleyball Cup, held from June 17 to June 27, 2004, in Mexicali and Tijuana, Mexico.

Head Coach: Lorne Sawula

Head Coach: Kevin Hambly

Source:

References

 NORCECA
 USA Volleyball
 Volleyball Canada (Archived 2009-05-14)

S
P